Maciej Mańka (born 30 June 1989) is a Polish professional footballer who plays as a right-back for GKS Tychy.

Notes
 

1989 births
People from Tychy
Sportspeople from Silesian Voivodeship
Living people
Polish footballers
Association football midfielders
GKS Tychy players
Górnik Zabrze players
Ekstraklasa players
I liga players
II liga players